The Arts Theatre is a theatre in Great Newport Street, in Westminster, Central London.

History 
It opened on 20 April 1927 as a members-only club for the performance of unlicensed plays, thus avoiding theatre censorship by the Lord Chamberlain's office. It was one of a small number of committed, independent theatre companies, including the Hampstead Everyman, the Gate Theatre Studio and the Q Theatre, which took risks by producing a diverse range of new and experimental plays, or plays that were thought to be commercially non-viable on the West End. The theatrical producer Norman Marshall referred to these as 'The Other Theatre' in his 1947 book of the same name.

The theatre opened with a revue by Herbert Farjeon entitled Picnic, produced by Harold Scott and with music by Beverley Nichols. Its first important production was Young Woodley by John Van Druten, staged in 1928, which later transferred to the Savoy Theatre when the Lord Chamberlain's ban was lifted. In 1938, a four-week revival of the Stokes brothers' Oscar Wilde, starring Francis L. Sullivan and produced by Ronald Adam, opened on 25 October. This coincided with a Broadway production of the play. In 1940 the ballet La fête étrange was staged at the theatre, choreographed by Andrée Howard. It has subsequently been performed over 200 times by The Royal Ballet, and by Scottish Ballet.

In 1942, Alec Clunes and John Hanau took over the running of the theatre and for ten years produced a wide range of plays, winning a reputation as a 'pocket national theatre'. In 1946, Clunes teamed with author Peter Elstob to raise £20,000, which eventually put the theatre on a sound financial footing.

Ronnie Barker made his West End début at the production of Mourning Becomes Electra at the Arts Theatre in 1955 which was directed by Sir Peter Hall, with whom Barker had worked at the Oxford Playhouse. Barker remained a West End actor for some years, appearing in numerous plays between 1955 and 1968. These included two performances each night as he played a gypsy in Listen to the Wind at the Arts Theatre in 1955. In August 1955, aged 24, Hall directed the English-language premiere of Samuel Beckett's Waiting for Godot at the theatre. This was an important turning point in modern theatre for Britain. Subsequently, from 1956 to 1959, Hall ran the Arts Theatre.

Between April 1962 and January 1967 the Arts Theatre was known as the New Arts Theatre.

From 1967 to 1999 the Arts also became a home for the Unicorn children's theatre, under the direction of its founder Caryl Jenner. She took over the lease, initially for six years. Meanwhile, adult performances continued in the evening, including Tom Stoppard's satirical double-bill Dirty Linen and New-Found-Land which, opening in June 1976, ran for four years at the Arts.

The theatre's lease was taken over by a consortium of UK and US producers in 2000 for a five-year period, and it was relaunched as a West End theatre with the anniversary production of Julian Mitchell's play Another Country, directed by Stephen Henry. Notable productions during this time included Closer to Heaven, the Jonathan Harvey/Pet Shop Boys musical, and The Vagina Monologues.

In 2011, the theatre was taken over by JJ Goodman and led by Artistic Director Mig Kimpton under the business management of Louis Hartshorn. The Arts now operates as the West End's smallest commercial receiving house, seating a maximum of 350 in a two-tier basement auditorium.

In 2014, Louis Hartshorn took over from Mig Kimpton as Executive Director and alongside long standing business partner Brian Hook as Producer. Expanding over an additional floor the Arts Theatre now houses two rehearsal rooms and a 60-capacity studio theatre 'Above the Arts'.

Productions 
 Rosmersholm (with Marius Goring and Lucie Mannheim) - 1948
 Too True to Be Good (with Marius Goring and Lucie Mannheim) - 1948
 The Cherry Orchard (with Marius Goring) - 1948
 South – 1955
 The Children's Hour – 1955
Templeton - 1958
 In White America – 1964
 Elegies – 7–14 November 2004
 A Guide to Sexual Misery – Jan to Apr 2011
 Woody Sez: The Life & Music of Woody Guthrie – Jan to Apr 2011
 Eve Ferret Sings – Mar 2011
 David Wood's Storytime – April 2011
 Face to Face at the Arts (series) (with Stephen Mangan) – May 2011
 Bette and Joan – May to Jun 2011
 Eve Ferret Sings Again – Jun 2011
 Seussical (with Stephen Flaherty and Lynn Ahrens) – Dec 2012
 The Tailor Made Man (with Faye Tozer, Mike McShane and Dylan Turner) – Feb to Apr 2013
 Seussical (with Stephen Flaherty and Lynn Ahrens) – Nov 2013
 Ghost Stories – February 2014 to March 2015
 Bad Jews March to June 2015
 Annie JR  August 2015
 USHERS: The Front of House Musical October to November 2015
 The Blues Brothers: Xmas Special November 2015 to January 2016
 All That Fall – April to May 2016
 A View from Islington North – May to July 2016
 American Idiot July to November 2015, July to September 2016
 Murder Ballad – September to December 2016
 A Christmas Carol with Simon Callow – December 2016 to January 2018
 Toyer
 Saturday Night
 Shout!
 The Show Girls
 F**king Men
 Hotel Follies
 Catwalk Confidential
 Cymbeline
 A Christmas Carol
 Daisy Pulls It Off
 Nunsense A-Men
 Naked Boys Singing
 A Man of No Importance
 Party
 Oddsocks Present Romeo and Juliet
 Shirley Jones
 Wet Weather Cover
 The Complete Works of William Shakespeare (abridged)
 Lillies on the Land
 The Music of the Blues Brothers – A Tribute
 Park Avenue Cat
 Milked
 Six
 Oh My Goddess!
 The Female Edit
 The Wipers Times
 The Toxic Avenger
 Oleanna
 The Choir of Man (9 November 2021 - 3 April 2022)
 Bonnie and Clyde (9 April 2022 - 10 July 2022)

References 
Citations

Sources

External links 

 
 Arts Theatre Programmes
 The Arts Theatre and Unicorn Theatre Archive is held by the Victoria and Albert Museum Theatre and Performance Department.

West End theatres
Theatres in the City of Westminster